Luena Airport  is an airstrip serving the city of Luena in Haut-Lomami Province, Democratic Republic of the Congo.

See also

Transport in the Democratic Republic of the Congo
List of airports in the Democratic Republic of the Congo

References

External links
 FallingRain - Luena
 OpenStreetMap - Luena
 HERE Maps - Luena
 OurAirports - Luena

Airports in Haut-Lomami